Tavakkolabad (also Romanized as Tavakkolābād) is a village in Khursand Rural District, in the Central District of Shahr-e Babak County, Kerman Province, Iran. At the 2006 census, its population was 69, in 18 families.

References 

Populated places in Shahr-e Babak County